Sunshine Girl refers to pinup girls featured in most of the daily newspapers of the Sun chain in Canada.

History
The feature started with the Toronto Sun, which was launched in 1971, and was adapted from British tabloids with similar featured women. While the British tabloids started publishing photos of topless models in 1970, the Sunshine Girls have never been photographed in this manner.  The photos usually feature a clothed or swim-suited female model, actress, athlete. Although primarily published in color since the 1990s, prior to this the feature alternated between color and black and white and was exclusively black and white in the 1970s and early 1980s.

Typically featured on page 3 of the Sun in through the 1990s, the Sunshine Girl moved to the back page of the sports section in the early 2000s. In 2011, the Sunshine Girl was restored to page 3 in some, not all, versions of the Sun, and two different photos of the same Sunshine Girl are run each day.  Famous former SUNshine girls include: Amanda Coetzer, Ann Rohmer, Trish Stratus , Stacy Keibler, and Krista Erickson (Sun News Network anchor, who appeared on the date of that network's 2011 launch).

Additional images of the day's Sunshine Girl are posted each day to the Sun newspapers' websites, along with  behind-the-scenes videos of select models.

At least twice a year, the Sun Group produces and sells a calendar featuring a selection of Sunshine Girls. Typically, the Girls who are selected for the calendar are chosen by the public online and by a mail-in vote.

Spinoffs and Knockoffs
 There was a Sunshine Boy feature in the Sun as well, further on in each daily paper. This feature was discontinued in 2006.
 Sunshine Girl Magazine is a men's magazine published from Miami, Florida. Sunshine Girl Magazine is sprung out of the Suns annual Sunshine Girl calendar.

Criticism
The Sunshine Girl series has been criticized by some readers and media commentators for objectifying women. Critics have also condemned the series as degrading and inappropriate for a newspaper as a medium that purports to publish credible journalism. On November 14, 1985, the Ontario Press Council upheld at least one reader complaint saying the feature "portrays women as sex objects", although there were no penalties attached to this ruling. Margaret Coulter of Toronto made the complaint, saying a newspaper was not an appropriate medium for the suggestive photos, which made her feel "embarrassed and offended." Coulter said she had the same feelings about the Sunshine Boy feature.

See also
Page 3

References

External links 
 Official SUNshine Girl Facebook Application
 SUNshine Girl of the Canadian SUN news group
 Sunshine Girl Magazine

Toronto Sun
1971 establishments in Canada